Chris Levis (born March 25, 1976 in Windsor, Ontario) is a Canadian goaltender for the Colorado Mammoth in the National Lacrosse League. Levis was the backup for the Mammoth in the 2006 season behind Gee Nash when they won the NLL Championship. He returned to the Mammoth in the 2010 season, where he ranked 12th in saves. He made 3 key overtime saves in his biggest win as a Mammoth, beating the Boston Bandits 9-8 in overtime to end a home losing streak at Pepsi Center dating back to April 2009, which ended March 25, 2011. He has previously played for Columbus, New York, Buffalo, Edmonton and Calgary.

Statistics

NLL

References

1976 births
Living people
Buffalo Bandits players
Canadian expatriate lacrosse people in the United States
Canadian lacrosse players
Colorado Mammoth players
Edmonton Rush players
Lacrosse people from Ontario
Sportspeople from Windsor, Ontario